Etchingwood is a small cluster of mostly detached properties and farms within the civil parish of Buxted in the Wealden district of East Sussex, England. Framfield Road, Buxted and its namesake Etchingwood Lane both run through the area of Etchingwood, joining it to Hammonds Green to the South and Buxted to the North. The area has several public footpaths and bridleways running through it and there are long distant views of the South Downs National Park.

Villages in East Sussex
Buxted